Per Claes Sven Edvard Engdahl (25 February 1909 – 4 May 1994) was a leading Swedish far-right politician. He was a leader of Sveriges Fascistiska Kamporganisation (SFKO or Sweden's Fascist Action Organization), during the 1930s.

Born in Jönköping, he came from a conservative family with a strong military tradition. He attended Uppsala University, where he studied philosophy.

Fascism
Engdahl began his political career while still a student in Uppsala, advocating a fascist-influenced policy of his own creation which he called nysvenskhet ('new Swedishness'). An attempt was made in 1932 to incorporate his group into the newly formed Nationalsocialistiska folkpartiet of Sven Olov Lindholm (a pro-Nazi party) although Engdahl resisted their overtures.

As an ideology, nysvenskhet supported a strong Swedish nationalism, corporatism, anti-Semitism and anti-communism as well as a cult of personality around Engdahl himself. It placed an emphasis on racial nationalism, advocated the Madagascar Plan, and called for the replacement of the existing Swedish parliament with a corporatist body elected on an occupational franchise. The policy overtly rejected Nazism, instead looking more towards Benito Mussolini for inspiration while also seeking to unify all groups against democracy, whether they were fascist or not. He wrote the first published Swedish biography on Mussolini.

However, he is also known to have praised Hitler in comments such as: "Today [23 April 1944], we can only salute Adolf Hitler as God's chosen savior of Europe"  Nonetheless Engdahl also frequently claimed that he followed neither man, arguing that his ideology was purely Swedish in nature, and as such he claimed his inspirations to be Sven Hedin, Adrian Molin and Rudolf Kjellén.

Engdahl founded his own group, Riksförbundet Det nya Sverige, in 1937. Before long he merged this group into the pro-Nazi National League of Sweden, becoming deputy leader of this organisation. Adopting a policy which he described as nysvenskhet ('new Swedishness') he split from this group in 1941 to lead his own Nysvenska Rörelsen which continued to strongly support the Nazis.

Before the end of the war his supporters had united in the Svensk Opposition (Swedish Opposition) which also included the supporters of Birger Furugård. The group advocated Swedish entry into World War II on the Axis side and went public with this aim in 1942, but in fact the country stayed neutral.

Post-war activity
After World War II, Engdahl revived Nysvenska Rörelsen, publishing a paper, Vägen Framåt ('The Way Forward'), that concerned itself with attacks on communism and capitalism. Changes in the defamation laws in Sweden however meant that he largely had to eliminate the earlier strident anti-Semitic rhetoric from his writing. Nonetheless his reputation for attacks on the Jews saw him barred from entry into both West Germany and Switzerland. He was one of the contributors of a Nazi publication, Der Weg, which was published from 1947 in Buenos Aires, Argentina.

Engdahl also became a leading figure in the European neo-fascist scene, and was instrumental in setting up the European Social Movement (ESM) in 1951, hosting the meeting in his home base of Malmö. His book Västerlandets Förnyelse, published the same year, was widely read in such circles and was adopted as the chief ideological document of the ESM in 1954. Although this group proved unsuccessful, Engdahl continued to be active in such circles for many years. He presented himself as an electoral candidate in Gothenburg in 1958 and, although unsuccessful, he captured enough votes to deny the Swedish Social Democratic Party the seat.

Engdahl continued to be politically active until well into his old age and was a frequent contributor to the far-right journal Nation Europa. He also served as part of the journal's five man editorial board alongside Hans Oehler, Paul van Tienen, Erik Laerum and Erich Kern. He died in Malmö aged 85.

Legacy
His name once again became controversial after his death, when some of his personal correspondence was released, revealing that Ingvar Kamprad, the founder of IKEA, had been a member of Engdahl's groups during the war.

References

Bibliography

Footnotes

1909 births
1994 deaths
People from Jönköping
Pan-European nationalism
Swedish Nazis
Swedish neo-Nazis
Swedish anti-communists
Uppsala University alumni
20th-century Swedish politicians